Iliya Zhelev, also written as Илия Желев, born 1961 in Plovdiv, Bulgaria, is a famous Eastern European painter.

Life 
Iliya Zhelev, a European artist, was born in Plovdiv, Bulgaria in 1961. Throughout his career he has become iconic in his home country and well-known on an international level. His work has become popular in Germany through numerous successful solo exhibitions in galleries throughout the country. In 2005 EnBW, a large power supply company, sponsored an exhibition of his work. Zhelev's paintings are owned by the National Art Gallery Sofia, various private and state galleries and private collections in Germany, United States, Switzerland, Italy, Sweden United Arab Emirates, UK, Austria, Greece, France, the Netherlands, Luxembourg, Russia and Israel.
Zhelev's influences include the artists Paul Klee, Wassily Kandinsky and Joan Miró. His paintings and collages are recognizable because of the unique style he employs. Zhelev fills his canvases with colorful and symbolically-rich squares in different formations, making his paintings stand out with their vibrancy and richness of expressiveness.

Selected  exhibitions

 2020 Chagall and Zhelev, Mensing Gallery, Konstanz, Germany
 2019 Mensing Gallery, Hamburg, Germany
 Galerie Meisterstück, Nurnberg,Germany 
 Galerie Kunststücke, Munich, Germany  
 2018 Bilder König Gallery, Darmstadt,Germany 
 2017 Haus der Kunst Gallery, Andreas Lendl, Graz, Austria 
 Mensing Gallery, Berlin, Germany  
 Mensing Gallery, Hamburg, Germany  
 Mensing Gallery, Hannover, Germany  
 Cameo Kunsthandel Gallery, Heilbronn, Germany 
 Cameo Kunsthandel Gallery, Mannheim, Germany 
 2016 Mensing Gallery, Konstanz, Germany  
 Galerie Meisterstück, Nuremberg, Germany 
 2015 Mensing Gallery, Hannover, Germany  
 Mensing Gallery, Hamm, Germany 
 2014 Haus der Kunst Gallery, Andreas Lendl, Graz, Austria 
 Cameo Kunsthandel Gallery, Heilbronn, Germany 
 Cameo Kunsthandel Gallery, Mannheim, Germany 
 2013 Mensing Gallery, Konstanz, Germany  
 Mensing Gallery, Munich, Germany 
 2012 Chagall and Zhelev, Mensing Gallery, Hamburg      
 Gallery Haus der Gemalde, Nurnberg, Germany
 Chagall and Zhelev, Mensing Gallery, Berlin		  
 Gallery Aspect, Plovdiv, Bulgaria 
 Gallery Prat, Linz, Austria 
 Haus der Gemälde, Nuremberg, Germany 
 2011 Mensing Gallery, Berlin, Germany     
 Mensing Gallery, Dusseldorf, Germany  
 Gallery Burger, Munich, Germany  
 Von Poll Gallery, Gruenwald, Germany  
 2010 Anquin's Gallery, Reus, Barcelona, Spain 
 Gallery Aspect, Plovdiv, Bulgaria 
 2009 Mensing Gallery, Baden-Baden, Germany 
 Mensing Gallery, Hamburg, Germany 
 Mensing Gallery, Dusseldorf, Germany 
 Tuyap Art Fair, Istanbul, Turkey 
 Mensing Gallery, Hannover, Germany
 Mensing Gallery, Berlin, Germany 
 Mensing Gallery, Hamm-Rhynern, Germany
 2008 Mensing Gallery, Hannover, Germany 
 Mensing Gallery, Konstanz, Germany 
 Mensing Gallery, Hamburg, Germany 
 Valor Sanat Gallery, Ankara, Turkey 
 Art International Zurich, Switzerland 
 2007 Valor Sanat Gallery, Ankara, Turkey 
 Kersten Art Gallery, Brunnthal, Germany 
 Gallery Burger, Munich, Germany
 Art Bodensee, Dornbirn, Austria
 Rapp Art Gallery, Wil, Switzerland 
 Tuyap Art Fair, Istanbul, Turkey 
 St’art 2006, Strasbourg, France 
 2006 Schortgen Gallery, Luxemburg  
 Kuhn Gallery, Liliental, Germany 
 Kuhn Gallery, Berlin, Germany 
 Aspect Gallery, Plovdiv, Bulgaria 
 Mensing Gallery, Hannover, Germany 
 Mensing Gallery, Dusseldorf, Germany 
 Mensing Gallery, Hamm-Rhynern, Germany
 St’art 2006, Strasbourg, France 
 2005 EnBW Gallery, Stuttgart, Germany 
 Gallery Burger, Munich, Germany 
 2004 Schortgen Gallery, Luxemburg 
 2003 Gallery Prannerstrasse, Munich, Germany 
 Milenio Gallery, Venice, Italia
 2002 Art Fair Frankfurt, Germany 
 2001 Prannerstrasse, Munich, Germany 
 2000 Hirnickel Art Gallery, Bad Kissingen, Germany 
 Art Fair Frankfurt, Germany 
 1999 Galerie in der Prannerstrasse, Munich, Germany
 1998 Europ' Art, Astra Art Gallery, Geneva, Switzerland 
 Rathaus, Brühl, Germany 
 1997 Galerie in der Prannerstrasse, Munich, Germany 
 Kersten Art Gallery, Brunnthal, Germany 
 1996 Hirnickel Art Gallery, Bad Kissingen, Germany
 Cebit Hanover, Germany
 1995 Galerie in der Prannerstrasse, Munich, Germany 
 1994 Art Fair Frankfurt, Germany
 1993 Galerie in der Prannerstrasse, Munich, Germany

External links
 Iliya Zhelev website
 Mensing Gallery, Germany
 Meisterstück Gallery, Nuremberg, Germany
 https://www.galerie-kunststuecke-muenchen.de/?project=iliya-zhelev
 Kunst Alendl Gallery, Graz, Austria
 Rapp Gallery, Will, Switzerland

Artists from Plovdiv
German artists
1961 births
Living people